Bultaco was a Spanish manufacturer of two-stroke motorcycles from 1958 to 1983.

In May 2014, a new Bultaco was announced.

Origins
The origin of the Bultaco motorcycle company dates from May 1958. Francesc "Paco" Bultó was a director of the Montesa motorcycle company, founded in 1944. After several years of steady growth and road racing success, in 1957 Montesa moved to larger facilities. The move was protracted, disrupting production and was followed by a downturn in the Spanish economy. This slump brought to a head disagreements between Bultó and the other senior director Pere Permanyer. As an economy measure, Permanyer (the majority shareholder) felt that the company should withdraw from racing. Bultó, the driving force behind the racing program and responsible for much of the company’s technical expertise was vehemently opposed. Failing to reach a compromise, Bultó decided to leave Montesa to concentrate on his other business interests. Perhaps unsurprisingly, the majority of Montesa's racing department left shortly afterwards as well.

Bultaco is formed
The suggestion to form a new company is said to have come a few days later when Sr. Bultó was invited to a meeting by several of the former staff of Montesa's racing department. Keen to return to racing, they persuaded him that their greatest hope lay in forming a new company. Setting up shop in very primitive conditions at an old farm owned by Bultó, things developed quickly. On 24 March 1959, Bultaco held a press day and launched its first motorcycle, the road-going 125cc Bultaco Tralla 101, named after a Spanish word for whip. Just two months later Bultaco entered its first Spanish Grand Prix, taking seven of the first ten places.

The company name and logo
"Bultaco" comes from combining the first four letters of Sr. Bultó's surname with the last three of his nickname "Paco". The name was a suggestion of one of Bultaco's premier racers, and close friend of Sr. Bultó, John Grace from Gibraltar. CEMOTO is an acronym for "Compañia Española de Motores". The other part of the company logo, the "Thumbs up" symbol, came after Sr. Bultó witnessed British motorcycle racer David Whitworth giving the signal to his pit crew to signify that all was well.  Sete Gibernau used to have this on the back of his crash helmet when he raced MotoGP.

In 1998, rights to the Bultaco name were purchased by Marc Tessier, who used it to help launch a range of purpose-built trials motorcycles from his company Sherco Moto S.A.R.L. The bikes were initially named Bultaco Shercos. In 2000, the bikes became 'Sherco by Bultaco', and in 2001 the Bultaco name was dropped altogether. The US trademark is now owned by HDW Enterprises, parent company of a parts and repair specialist for vintage Bultacos.

Bultaco produces electric motorbikes in Barcelona, Catalonia, Spain, also the site of the original 1958 factory.

Notable products

Although they made road and road racing motorcycles, the company had its greatest success with models for off-road competition; the Pursang for motocross, the Matador for enduros, the Sherpa T for observed trials competition, and the Astro for short flat-track.

Perhaps the most famous Bultaco model is the Sherpa T, a trials bike, which revolutionised the sport in the 1960s. At that time trials was almost exclusively a British sport using big heavy four-stroke machines. Irish trials ace Sammy Miller teamed with Bultó to produce a lightweight two-stroke machine which, overnight, rendered the heavy four-strokes obsolete. Miller won the gruelling Scottish Six Days Trial in 1965, and then repeated the feat with wins in 1967 and 1968. He also claimed the European Trials Championship in 1968 and 1970. This coincided with and, perhaps, stimulated the growth in the popularity of trials in Europe and later the USA, which provided a lucrative market for Bultaco in the years to come. Bultaco dominated the World Trials Championship in the 1970s, winning the title eight times, and winning the Scottish Six Days Trial four times.

Bultaco's premier model in the USA, the Pursang, was an excellent handling and powerful 250 cc competition model that was competitive in virtually any type of speed-based off-road competition. The Pursang range was later expanded to 125 cc, 360cc and 370 cc.

The Bultaco Astro was a very popular short-track racer in the United States, and was used by many AMA Grand National riders in the US in pursuit of their championships, including Mike Kidd, Terry Poovey, Bubba Rush, and hundreds of other top-class competitors. The Astro had a superb power-band, perfectly suited for short-tracks, and some half-miles as well.

Bultaco motorcycles were mainly powered by single-cylinder, air cooled, two-stroke engines, but they also made water cooled powerplants. The rider was required to mix the oil and gasoline manually. Built in Barcelona, Spain, Bultaco motorcycles were exported throughout the world, but their largest market ultimately became the USA, allowing aspiring racers to purchase legitimately competitive motorcycles without modification. The Bultaco engine and transmission were universally interchangeable between models and engine capacities; one could replace the cylinder from a 175 cc engine with a 200 cc, 250 cc, 350 cc or even 360 cc capacity Bultaco cylinder. As Bultaco produced the cylinders, pistons, rings & cylinder heads for all engine capacities, no aftermarket parts were required, as with other brands.

Due to industrial unrest and market pressures, Bultaco production closed in 1979. The factory reopened in 1980, but closed again in 1983. A new series of electric Bultacos was announced mid-2014, and it began sales in 2015.

Sherco motorcycle company , founded in 1998 in Barcelona, derives its name from an amalgamation of two words, Sherpa and Bultaco.

Former MotoGP star, Sete Gibernau, is the grandson of the founder of Bultaco, Paco Bultó.

References

External links 

Bultaco at Spanish Wikipedia 
 

Motorcycle manufacturers of Spain
Spanish brands
Motorcycle trials
Manufacturing companies established in 1958
Manufacturing companies disestablished in 1983
1983 disestablishments in Spain
Spanish companies established in 1958